The Yellow Hill Formation is a geologic formation in Nevada. It preserves fossils dating back to the Ordovician period.

See also

 List of fossiliferous stratigraphic units in Nevada
 Paleontology in Nevada

References
 

Ordovician geology of Nevada
Ordovician southern paleotropical deposits